Sep. 25 - Eastern Orthodox Church calendar - Sep. 27

All fixed commemorations below celebrated on October 9 by Orthodox Churches on the Old Calendar.

For September 26th, Orthodox Churches on the Old Calendar commemorate the Saints listed on September 13.

Saints
 Righteous Gideon, Judge of Israel (c. 1307 BC)
 Repose of the Holy Apostle and Evangelist John the Theologian (2nd century)
 Virgin-martyrs Thekla, Mariamne, Martha, Mary, and Ennatha, five nuns beheaded in Persia under Shapur II (4th century)  (see also: June 9 )
 Martyr Kyra (Cyra).

Pre-Schism Western saints
 Saint Senator, a saint honoured in Albano in Italy.
 Saint Eusebius of Bologna, Bishop of Bologna, Confessor (c. 400)
 Saint Vigilius, Bishop of Brescia in Lombardy in Italy (c. 506)
 Saint Meugan (Mawghan, Morgan), a disciple of St Illtyd who lived as a hermit and reposed on the Isle of Bardsey in Wales (6th century)
 Saint Amantius, a priest in Città di Castello near Perugia in Italy, who was personally known to St Gregory the Great who revered him (c. 600)
 Saint Colmán Elo, a nephew of St Columba, he founded monasteries in Lynally (Land-Elo, Lin-Alli) and in Muckamore, Ireland (c. 610)
 Saint Nilus the Younger, of Rossano, Calabria, founder of the monastery of Grottaferrata (Crypta-Ferrata) (1004)

Post-Schism Orthodox saints
 Venerable Ephraim, founder of Perekop Monastery, Wonderworker of Novgorod (1492)
 Saint Neagoe Basarab, Prince of Wallachia (1521) 
 Venerable John the Cave-Dweller, ascetic of Sia, Cyprus, Wonderworker.

New martyrs and confessors
 New Hieromartyrs Athanasius Dokukin, Alexander Levitsky, and Demetrius Rozanov, Priests (1937)
 Martyrs John Zolotov, and Nicholas Gusev (1937)
 New Hieromartyr Vladimir Viatsky, Priest (1939)

Other commemorations
 Translation (1964) of the Honorable Skull of the Apostle Andrew the First-called to Patras.
 Glorification (1989) of New Hiero-confessor Tikhon (Bellavin), Patriarch of Moscow and all Russia (1925) 
 Arrival of the Iveron Icon of the Mother of God in Georgia (1989)

Icon gallery

Notes

References

Sources
 September 26/October 9. Orthodox Calendar (PRAVOSLAVIE.RU).
 October 9 / September 26. HOLY TRINITY RUSSIAN ORTHODOX CHURCH (A parish of the Patriarchate of Moscow).
 September 26. OCA - The Lives of the Saints.
 The Autonomous Orthodox Metropolia of Western Europe and the Americas (ROCOR). St. Hilarion Calendar of Saints for the year of our Lord 2004. St. Hilarion Press (Austin, TX). p. 72.
 The Twenty-Sixth Day of the Month of September. Orthodoxy in China.
 September 26. Latin Saints of the Orthodox Patriarchate of Rome.
 The Roman Martyrology. Transl. by the Archbishop of Baltimore. Last Edition, According to the Copy Printed at Rome in 1914. Revised Edition, with the Imprimatur of His Eminence Cardinal Gibbons. Baltimore: John Murphy Company, 1916. pp. 297–298.
 Rev. Richard Stanton. A Menology of England and Wales, or, Brief Memorials of the Ancient British and English Saints Arranged According to the Calendar, Together with the Martyrs of the 16th and 17th Centuries. London: Burns & Oates, 1892. p. 459.
Greek Sources
 Great Synaxaristes:  26 ΣΕΠΤΕΜΒΡΙΟΥ. ΜΕΓΑΣ ΣΥΝΑΞΑΡΙΣΤΗΣ.
  Συναξαριστής. 26 Σεπτεμβρίου. ECCLESIA.GR. (H ΕΚΚΛΗΣΙΑ ΤΗΣ ΕΛΛΑΔΟΣ).
  26/09/2016. Ορθόδοξος Συναξαριστής. 
Russian Sources
  9 октября (26 сентября). Православная Энциклопедия под редакцией Патриарха Московского и всея Руси Кирилла (электронная версия). (Orthodox Encyclopedia - Pravenc.ru).
  26 сентября по старому стилю  /  9 октября по новому стилю. Русская Православная Церковь - Православный церковный календарь на 2016 год.

September in the Eastern Orthodox calendar